The New York City Lab School for Collaborative Studies is a secondary school in the Chelsea neighborhood of Manhattan in New York City. It serves students in grades 6–12 and was described as one of the best schools in Manhattan in 2010 by the New York Post and CUNY. The school is a part of the New York City Department of Education.

Admission
Admission into the 6th grade is based on an entrance exam consisting of one page of mathematics problems and an essay. For admission into the 9th grade, students must follow the DOE high school admissions process. As of 2013, admissions requirements for the high school are a minimum of 85% in all 7th grade classes and a grade of 3 to 4 (or a score of 650) in the 7th grade reading and math exams. Admission into both the 6th and 9th grades is competitive, with 3000 students applying for 190 places in the 6th grade and with approximately 3000 students applying for 136 places in the 9th grade. Lab Middle and Lab High are two discrete schools, and students who are accepted to Lab Middle School are not automatically admitted to Lab high school.  Lab high school gives priority to applicants from district 2.

School hours
The Lab School's hours are from 8:30 am to 2:50 pm for the high school and 8:00 am to 2:20 pm for the middle school. Students may arrive from 7:30 until 8:00 to have free breakfast in the school's cafeteria. The middle school has one of the earliest dismissals among middle schools.

Principals

The principal of the NYC Lab Middle School (Grades 6–8) is Megan Adams. The principal of the high school (grades 9–12) is Brooke Jackson. The Lab School was founded in 1987 and the first location was on 82nd street between First and Second Avenue. Sheila Breslaw and Rob Menken were the founding Co-Directors and Principals.

Ebony Washington
Ebony Washington was a Lab High School student who died of AIDS during 10th grade. A commemorative quilt was first made for her by her class. In 2005, a 6th grade class made a second commemorative quilt in her honor. Since 1997, there has been an annual HIV/ AIDS Action Day for all Lab students in the first week of December. This day is used to bring HIV/AIDS awareness, LGBTQ acceptance, and sexual health education to students within the school. This is done through collaborating with many local health and education organizations.  The day is currently organized by the AIDS Action League, a group of  High School students founded by Alex Tell, Lexi Sasanow and Susanna Banks in 2006. The League handles all of the logistics of the AIDS Action Day, including scheduling workshops, collaborating with outside organizations, and planning social action initiatives.

TASTES from the Meatpacking district through Chelsea
In May 2009, Lab collaborated with some of New York City's top restaurants for "TASTES from the Meatpacking District through Chelsea." The festival featured a walk-around tasting of several New York City restaurants for the purpose of raising money for Lab student programs. 
As of 2016, TASTES (now held in the fall of each year) continues to be a well-attended, highly publicized fundraiser for Lab Middle and High School.

Notable alumni
Morena Baccarin (Attended for 7th and 8th grades) – Actress 
Claire Danes (Attended for 7th and 8th grades) – Actress 
Audrey Gelman, Former CEO of The Wing - Businesswoman 
Adam Hann-Byrd (Graduated 2000) – Actor
Charlie Hofheimer (Graduated 1999) – Actor
Kamara James (Attended Jr. High) – US Olympic Fencer 
Michela Marino Lerman (Graduated 2004) - Jazz Tap Dancer
Max Lugavere (Graduated 2000) – Host on Current TV
Ramón Rodríguez - Actor 
Nick Valensi (Attended from 10th–12th grade; graduated in 1998) – Guitarist for The Strokes
Hunter Walker (Attended Jr. High) - Journalist
AJR -  American pop band 
Qian Julie Wang - Author

References

Educational institutions established in 1987
Public high schools in Manhattan
Public middle schools in Manhattan
Chelsea, Manhattan
1987 establishments in New York City